Aldo Clementi (25 May 1925 – 3 March 2011) was an Italian classical composer.

Life
Aldo Clementi was born in Catania, Italy. He studied the piano, graduating in 1946 at the Conservatorio Santa Cecilia in Rome. His studies in composition began in 1941, and his teachers included  and Goffredo Petrassi. After receiving his diploma in 1954 again at the Conservatorio Santa Cecilia, he attended the Darmstadt summer courses from 1955 to 1962. Important influences during this period included meeting Bruno Maderna in 1956, and working at the electronic music studio of the Italian radio broadcaster RAI in Milan.

Poesia de Rilke (1946) was the first work of his to be performed (Vienna, 1947). Of more significance was the premiere of Cantata (1954), which was broadcast by North German Radio (Hamburg) in 1956. In 1959 he won second prize in the ISCM competition with Episodi (1958), and in 1963 he took first prize in the same competition, with Sette scene da "Collage" (1961).

He taught music theory at the University of Bologna from 1971 to 1992.

Clementi died on 3 March 2011 in Rome.

Style
In 1983 David Fanning described Clementi's style of decelerating canons as "sharing in the widespread post-serial depression of the 1970s", while in 1988 Paul Griffiths referred to the "Alexandrian simplicity of his solution to the current confusion in music. Clementi himself described his works as "an extremely dense counterpoint, relegating the parts to the shameful role of inaudible, cadaverous micro-organisms".

His music has been featured at Ultima, the Oslo Contemporary Music Festival (2009), performed and recorded by ensembles including Trio Accanto, the Quatuor Bozzini, the Ives Ensemble and the Contemporary Music Ensemble of Wales and broadcast by BBC Radio 3.

Selected works
Episodi (1958) for orchestra
Ideogrammi n. 1 (1959) for 16 instruments
Triplum (1960) for flute, oboe and clarinet
Collage (1961) – stage work
Informel 2 (1962) for 15 performers
Collage 2 (1962) for electronics
Informel 3 (1961–63) for orchestra
Intavolatura (1963) for harpsichord
Variante A (1964) for mixed chorus and orchestra
Concerto (1970) for piano and 7 instruments
Concerto (1975) for piano, 24 instruments and carillons
Clessidra (1976) for chamber orchestra
L'orologio di Arcevla (1979) for 13 performers
Variazioni (1979) for viola solo
Capriccio (1979–1980) for viola and 24 instruments
Dodici variazioni (1980) for solo guitar
Fantasia su roBErto FABbriCiAni (1980–81) for flute and tape
Es (1981) – stage work
Parafrasi (1981) 18 voice canon realized with processor
Adagio (1983) for quintet with prepared piano
Ouverture (1984) for 12 flutes
Concerto (1986) for piano and 14 instruments
Fantasia (1987) for 4 guitars
Tribute (1988) for string quartet
Berceuse (1989) for orchestra
Romanza (1991) for piano and orchestra
The Plaint (1992) for female voice and 13 instruments
Wiegenlied (1994) for soprano and 5 instruments
Tre Ricercari (2000) for saxophone, piano and celesta/vibraphone/tubular bells
Sonate Y. (2002) for solo violin

References

Further reading
Clementi, Aldo, Maria Rosa De Luca, Salvatore Enrico Failla, and Graziella Seminara. 2005. Per Aldo Clementi: nell'occasione dei suoi ottant'anni, 25 maggio 2005. Catania: Università degli studi di Catania. 
Cresti, Renzo. 1990. Aldo Clementi: studio monografico e intervista. Milan: Edizioni Suvini Zerboni. 
Lux, Simonetta, and Daniela Tortora. 2005. Collage 1961: un'azione dell'arte di Achille Perilli e Aldo Clementi. Luxflux proto type arte contemporanea, Documenti 1. Rome: Gangemi. 
Mattietti, Gianluigi. 2001. Geometrie di musica: il periodo diatonico di Aldo Clementi. Lucca: Libreria musicale italiana. 
Osmond-Smith, David. 1981. "Aux creux néant musicien: Recent Work by Aldo Clementi". Contact, no. 23:5–9.
Osmond-Smith, David. 2001. "Clementi, Aldo". The New Grove Dictionary of Music and Musicians, second edition, edited by Stanley Sadie and John Tyrrell. London: Macmillan.
Seminara, Graziella, and Maria Rosa De Luca (eds.). 2008. Canoni, figure, carillons: itinerari della musica di Aldo Clementi: atti dell'incontro di studi, Facoltà di lettere e filosofia, Catania, 30–31 maggio 2005. Milan: Suvini Zerboni. .
Zaccagnini, Michele. 2016. "Deus ex Machina: Uncovering Aldo Clementi's System". Perspectives of New Music 54, no. 1 (Winter): 137–178.

1925 births
2011 deaths
Musicians from Catania
Conservatorio Santa Cecilia alumni
20th-century classical composers
21st-century classical composers
Italian male classical composers
Musicians from Bologna
Pupils of Goffredo Petrassi
Pupils of Karlheinz Stockhausen
20th-century Italian composers
Twelve-tone and serial composers
20th-century Italian male musicians
21st-century Italian male musicians